The New Mexico Historic Preservation Division is a division of the New Mexico Department of Cultural Affairs.

Responsibilities 
The division is responsible for the preservation of New Mexico's historical heritage. The division's activities include:

 Identifying and recording prehistoric and historic places, nominating them to the National Register of Historic Places and the State Register of Cultural Properties, and maintaining records of those places to be used for planning and research
 Administering tax-credit, low-interest loan, easement, and grant programs to provide preservation incentives
 Providing preservation-related technical assistance to agencies, local governments, and private owners
 Administering preservation laws and assisting other agencies and local governments in developing preservation regulations and ordinances
 Developing educational programs about New Mexico's past and about the value of preserving our heritage

References

External links

State history organizations of the United States
Historic preservation organizations in the United States
History of New Mexico
Government of New Mexico